Elisabeth Aspe (15 December 1860 – 25 August 1927) was an Estonian writer. She was born and died in Pärnu.

Works
 1881: "Enne ukse lukutamist"
 1887: "Kasuõde"
 1888: "Ennossaare Ain"
 1891: "Anna Dorothea"

References

External links
 Elisabeth Aspe at Estonian Writers' Online Dictionary

1860 births
1927 deaths
19th-century Estonian women writers
Estonian women novelists
Estonian women short story writers
People from Pärnu